An annular solar eclipse occurred on Tuesday, April 29, 2014. A solar eclipse occurs when the Moon passes between Earth and the Sun, thereby totally or partly obscuring the image of the Sun for a viewer on Earth. An annular solar eclipse occurs when the Moon's apparent diameter is smaller than the Sun's, blocking most of the Sun's light and causing the Sun to look like an annulus (ring). An annular eclipse appears as a partial eclipse over a region of the Earth thousands of kilometres wide.
The center of the Moon's shadow missed the Earth's South Pole, but the partial eclipse was visible from parts of Antarctica and Australia, and an annular eclipse was visible from a small part of Antarctica.

This eclipse's gamma value was closer to 1 than any other eclipse from 2000 B.C. to 3000 A.D. This means the center of the moon shadow passed almost exactly at the surface of the Earth, barely missing the Antarctic continent by a few kilometers.

Visibility
Animation of eclipse path

Images

Related eclipses

Eclipses of 2014 
 A total lunar eclipse on April 15.
 A non-central annular solar eclipse on April 29.
 A total lunar eclipse on October 8.
 A partial solar eclipse on October 23.

Solar eclipses 2011–2014

Note: Total Solar Eclipse on March 20, 2015, and a Partial Solar Eclipse of September 13, 2015 occur during the next lunar year set.

Saros 148

Tritos series

Metonic series

Notes

References

 A Partially Eclipsed Setting Sun, APOD 4/30/2014, partial eclipse of Adelaide, South Australia
 Brisbane Sunset Moonset, APOD 5/1/2014, partial eclipse of Brisbane, Queensland

2014 4 29
2014 in science
2014 4 29
April 2014 events